Abbas Pourkhosravani (born January 30, 1987) is an Iranian footballer who plays as a forward for Padideh Shandiz in the Azadegan League.

Club career
Pourkhosravani joined Shahin Bushehr in 2009 after spending the previous two seasons at Gol Gohar and becoming the top goalscorers of the Azadegan League. He signed a two years contract with Foolad in May 2012. His contract was terminated at the end of the season after he played only two matches. He joined Padideh Shandiz on 26 July 2013.

Club Career Statistics

Last Update  10 May 2013 

 Assist Goals

Honours

Club
Shahin Bushehr
Hazfi Cup
Runner up (1): 2011–12

References

1987 births
Living people
People from Sirjan
Iranian footballers
Gol Gohar players
Shahin Bushehr F.C. players
Shahr Khodro F.C. players
Foolad FC players
Persian Gulf Pro League players
Azadegan League players
Association football forwards